The Škoda 220 mm howitzer was a siege howitzer design which served with Germany, Poland, and Yugoslavia before and during World War II.

Description
The 220 mm howitzers were a compromise design for their time, with decent capability to destroy fortifications and yet still mobile. Constructively, the design shared many features with the 149 mm Skoda Model 1928 gun. The howitzer used only an immobile, fully-traversable siege mount which had to be offloaded from the transport platform into a shallow (0.5 m deep) pit before firing. Typical preparation time was three hours. The Skoda 220 mm howitzer utilized a hydro-pneumatic recoil system. Loading was manual, with separate shell and the bags of the propellant allowing nine different propelling charges. For transport, the howitzer was disassembled into three loads and each was towed by a separate eight-ton tractor.

History
The K-series was an entirely new design by the Škoda Works company of Czechoslovakia.  Although the exact development schedule is unknown, the first contract to deliver 12 artillery pieces was signed with the Kingdom of Yugoslavia in 1928. The howitzers were locally designated as M.28. In October 1929, a Polish delegation also evaluated the design. The contract to deliver 27 artillery pieces to Poland was signed in 1933, with actual deliveries happening circa 1934-1935. At least 14 Škoda 220 mm howitzers were captured by German forces from Poland in September 1939 and re-designated 22 cm Mörser 538(p). Also, some howitzers were captured in April 1941 from the Kingdom of Yugoslavia and re-designated 22 cm Mörser 538(j). Finally, 7 howitzers were captured by the Soviet Union from Poland and were re-used against Finland during the Winter War. The Army of Czechoslovakia had also considered adopting gun, but the plans were abandoned. The fragmentation (anti-personnel) shell for the howitzer was developed in Poland by June 1939, and at least 60 fragmentation shells were produced under German occupation.

Known German coastal batteries using 22 cm Mörser 538
Battery 47/977  in Kroken and Hetlefloten, 6 pieces
Battery 6/975 in Klinga, 3 pieces
Battery 4/974 in Reitan, 3 pieces

References

Bibliography
 Chamberlain, Peter & Gander, Terry. Heavy Artillery. New York: Arco, 1975 
 Gander, Terry and Chamberlain, Peter. Weapons of the Third Reich: An Encyclopedic Survey of All Small Arms, Artillery and Special Weapons of the German Land Forces 1939-1945. New York: Doubleday, 1979 

Artillery of Czechoslovakia
Artillery of Poland
Artillery of Yugoslavia
Siege artillery
220 mm artillery
World War II artillery of Germany
World War II artillery of the Soviet Union
Military equipment introduced in the 1920s